The  Rapid Equipping Force (REF) was a United States Army organization headquartered in Fort Belvoir, Virginia. The organization was charged with quickly providing Army units deployed globally with innovative government off-the-shelf and commercially available solutions that address urgent requirements within 180 days or less. The REF was able to do this through unique authorities and by maintaining a presence near the point of need. REF personnel were positioned in Iraq, Afghanistan, and Kuwait and mobile laboratories are available for quick solutions. Additionally, the REF empowered the Army at a grassroots level, enabling individual soldiers to communicate needs directly through simple request forms.

Along with leveraging existing technology to meet urgent needs of Army forces deployed globally, the REF also informed longer-term materiel development for the future force. In October 2020, the Army announced it would dissolve the Asymmetric Warfare Group and the Rapid Equipping Force, by year-end FY2021 (September 30, 2021).

Mission
The REF provides innovative materiel solutions to meet the urgent requirements of U.S. Army forces employed globally, informs materiel development for the future force, and on order expands to meet operational demands.

Functions
The REF lines of support fall into four distinct categories: assess, equip, insert, and inform. Its primary function is to equip units with technologies that fill identified capability gaps. The REF provides training on these technologies downrange and at home-stations. It can insert selected future force solutions for operational evaluation in addition to providing new capabilities not readily available in the existing Army inventory. Finally, the REF constantly identifies and assesses emerging technologies and Army practices concerning operational needs affecting force readiness.

Organization overview
The REF is structured to integrate three distinct functions to provide the Army with a responsive, rapid acquisition organization. First, the REF Director has the unique authority to validate requirements. Second, the REF has acquisition authority and provided by the United States Assistant Secretary of the Army for Acquisition, Logistics, and Technology chartered Project Manager housed within REF’s chain of command. Finally, the REF receives funding from a variety of sources, allowing it the flexibility to support Soldiers deployed around the world.

These three pillars of authority allow REF to quickly insert solutions into theater in weeks rather than years. REF aims to deliver items into Soldiers’ hands within 90 days, and has even provided a solution in 72 hours after learning of an urgent need.

The REF can receive requests for support from any soldier, from a private to the Chief of Staff of the Army. These requests are submitted via a simple document called a "10-Liner" that prompts soldiers to describe the capability gaps they are facing downrange or as they prepare to deploy. From that information, the REF team begins the analysis and procurement process in order to best equip the requesting unit.

It is important to note that the REF equips specific units, not the entirety of the Army. If a solution is applicable to a larger portion of the Army, REF works with partner organizations to transition technologies to project managers who can then field the equipment to a larger portion of the Army.

History
The REF was created in 2002 after U.S. soldiers realized the need for non-standard equipment to meet the demands of new terrain, warfare  tactics and their assigned missions. Since then, the REF has met challenges as diverse as enhancing soldier mobility, providing improved surveillance in austere locations, equipping operational energy sources and enhancing  communications.

The 2004 REF Charter and Implementation Guidance and Coordination memo, signed by Lieutenant General Richard A. Cody, formalized REF’s "equip," "insert," "assess" functions. The excerpt below outlines how each line of support would shape REF’s mission.

"The REF will identify and evaluate emerging technologies, concepts, and surrogates to estimate/approximate threshold capabilities, while simultaneously providing operationally relevant capabilities to our combat forces within a time frame relevant to current operations… It is my intent to insert critical future technologies and capabilities into the current force while continuously shaping the future force and accelerating its evolution. Therefore, I direct expansion of the mission of the REF to encompass two additional critical functions:

 First, the REF will analyze relevant technologies and capabilities that exist in the Army’s laboratory, developmental systems, other Services and Federal Agencies, and international sources, and when appropriate, bring these capabilities into an operational environment to examine and evaluate the concepts and their effectiveness. If suitable, the REF will assess the potential to accelerate fielding and the contribution such fielding would make to increased combat effectiveness. 
 Second, REF initiatives will serve as the testbed to construct a model for lasting change and improvement of Army business practices and to better streamline Army Acquisition processes. Establish a continuous feedback process to provide lessons learned and best practices identified through the rapid equipping process to the relevant staff and US Army  Major Command (MACOMs). The  Army Acquisition Executive (AAE), with the support of the REF, will use REF initiatives to develop a process to transfer REF initiatives to a fast-tracked fielding program of selected systems. The Assistant Secretary of the Army, Financial Management and Comptroller, in coordination with the Chief of Legislative Liaison and the REF, will develop a concept and Congressional strategy to support significant Army reprogramming actions and request modifications to laws as necessary to facilitate rapid acquisition when acceleration of future technologies contribute significant combat power to the force in the near term."

In January 2014, the REF was deemed critical by the Army and transitioned to the U.S. Army Training and Doctrine Command.

Discontinuation
On October 2, 2020, the Department of the Army announced the discontinuation of the REF as the U.S. Army transitions from counter-insurgency operations to a focus on multi-domain operations and large scale combat operations. TRADOC directed the orderly closure of REF facilities, transfer of equipment and property, and transition of military and civilian personnel (to support other army efforts). The REF will complete the transition no later than September 30, 2021.

Projects
The REF mitigates capability gaps across the spectrum of warfighter function areas and has supported many projects as listed below.

PackBot: Remote-Controlled, full sensor package capable tracked vehicle
Magnetometer: Commercial off the Shelf (COTS) ultra-sensitive metal detecting wand
Wellcam: Complete man-portable video system to search wells
Armor Kit: 4-door vehicle protection kit equipped to units during Operation Iraqi Freedom
PILAR: Acoustically based, fully passive system that determines sniper fire direction on LCD screen
Talon Robot: A man-portable robot used for the disposal of IEDs and other dangerous explosives
Boomerang Counter-Fire Detection: A gunfire locator that uses microphone sensors to detect where shots originate
Minotaur: A robotic loader with front mine rollers to support dismounted operations  
Raven: A hand-launched, remote controlled unmanned aerial vehicle for surveillance
Tactical Aerostats: Smaller aerostats used as ISR and communications platforms
Pole Cam: Extendable pole-mounted camera with a handheld receiver for situational awareness 
Rapid Deployment Integrated Surveillance System (RDISS): System to monitor movement near remote FOBs and COPs
Man-Portable Line Charge (MPLC): Backpack-packaged clearing charge to disrupt IED trigger mechanisms

The REF currently supports priority equipping efforts over a wide range of challenges including solutions for subterranean operations, electronic warfare, unmanned and counter-unmanned aerial systems, intelligence, and expeditionary force protection.

References

External links 
 Official REF Website
 Official U.S. Army Website
 Official TRADOC Website
 "Army Rapid Equipping Force Taking Root, Chief Says," National Defense, October 2006
 "Mobile Labs Build On-the-Spot Combat Solutions," Military News, 17 August 2012
 “Army 'can't afford' not to have Rapid Equipping Force, leader says,” Army.mil, 18 October 2013
 "Army Confirms Rapid Equipping Force as ‘Enduring’" Army News Service, 3 February 2014
 "How to Run the Pentagon: Letters to the Editor Regarding ‘Running the Pentagon Right,’" Foreign Affairs, May/June 2014
 "Battlefield tech demands: Rapid Equipping Force preps for surge with new Army brigades," Defense News, 27 February 2018
 “Rapid Equipping Force to deliver new electronic warfare platforms,” C4ISRNET 9 August 2018
 "Rapid Equipping Force in Afghanistan enables Soldiers' ideas into battlefield solutions," Army.mil, 15 November 2018
 "Rapid Response: Unit Works to Quickly Fulfill Urgent Requests" AUSA Army Magazine, 20 August 2019
 "Still in service: ‘Ex Lab’ is the US Army’s problem-solving MacGyver," Defense News, 14 October 2019
 "Temperature checks begin at Commissary," Belvoir Eagle, 8 April2020
 "Army REF deploys thermal imaging sensors," Army.mil, 1 May 2020
 "Army REF Expands Thermal Imaging Sensors Deployment Effort," DVIDS, 21 May 2020
 "FIGHTING COVID-19 -- Fort Rucker brings new asset to bear in protecting force, mission, surrounding communities," Army.mil, 5 June 2020
 "Army to discontinue AWG, REF efforts next year," Army.mil, 2 October 2020
 "Army to discontinue Asymmetric Warfare Group and Rapid Equipping Force," Army.mil, 2 October 2020

United States Army organization